Wind power in Hawaii has the potential to provide all of the electricity generation in the electricity sector in Hawaii. The 132 commercial wind turbines in the state have a total capacity of 236 MW. In 2015, wind turbines produced 6.4% of Hawaii's electricity. In 2012, Hawaii generated 367 million kWh from wind power.

Hawaii began research into wind power in the mid-1980s with a 340 kW turbine on Maui, and the 2.3MW Lalamilo Wells wind farm on Oahu and the 9MW Kamaoa wind farm on the Big Island of Hawaii . The MOD-5B, a 3.2MW wind turbine, on Oahu was the largest in the world in 1987. These early examples were all out of service by 2010.

Notable projects

Operational

Proposed wind farms
Two developers have submitted proposals for three offshore wind farms. They are under review by the Bureau of Ocean Energy Management.

Former wind farms
Kamaoa Wind Farm, 9.3 MW, in use 1987-2006
Lalamilo Wind Farm, 2.3 MW, in use 1986-2010. Repowered by a new farm at the site in 2017.

Community reactions 
In 2019 Kahuku residents protested the placement of wind towers, leading to hundreds of arrests for obstructing entry of equipment to the turbine sites. In 2021 residents and the Kahuku Community Association objected to the presence of 20 large-scale wind turbines in their neighborhood. They experienced problems from the noise and shadows that come and go with the turning of the blades, claiming that this produced sleep disruption, depression, seizures and other neurological effects. In response, rules that govern turbine siting, such as increasing the minimum distance from residences to 1.25 miles, are under review by the Honolulu City Council. Existing law allows an, e.g.,  to be placed 600 feet from the nearest house (1:1).The Hawaii State Energy Office offered support for a setback of a mile or more from homes and structures. Residents also expressed concern about the threat to endangered wildlife, particularly the opeapea bat.

Potential

Hawaii has the potential to install 3,000 MW of wind power, capable of generating 12,000 GWh/year with 80 meter hub heights operating at 30% capacity factor or more. Hawaii used 9,962 GWh in 2011, so Hawaii has the potential to generate all electricity used in the state from wind and solar power. In addition, Hawaii has the potential to generate 2,800,000 GWh/year from offshore wind power. Authorities approved feasibility in 2016 for 3 companies looking at floating wind turbines up to 400 MW.

See also

Solar power in Hawaii
Energy in Hawaii
Wind power in the United States
Renewable energy in the United States

References

External links

Renewable Energy Projects
The Cost and Feasibility of Floating Offshore Wind Energy in the O‘ahu Region – National Renewable Energy Laboratory

 
Energy in Hawaii